São Bento do Una is a city from the Northeastern Region of Brazil at the Pernambuco state. According to the IBGE, it has an estimated population of 60,042 inhabitants (2020). It is located at latitude 08°31'22" South and longitude 36°26'40" West, and at approximately 614 meters above sea level.

Fun Facts 
The city has a popular street party which the main attraction is a race of chickens.

Geography
 State - Pernambuco
 Region - Agreste Pernambucano
 Boundaries - Belo Jardim  (N); Jucati, Jupi and Lajedo  (S);  Capoeiras, Pesqueira and Sanharó  (W);  Cachoeirinha  (E)
 Area - 727 km2
 Elevation - 614 m
 Hydrography - Ipojuca and Una rivers
 Vegetation - Hipoxerófila caatinga
 Climate - Semi arid hot
 Distance to Recife - 207 km

Economy
The main economic activities in São Bento do Una are based in commerce and agribusiness, especially plantations of beans, corn and manioc and creations of livestock such as: chickens, quails and their eggs, cattle, milk, pigs, sheep, goats and donkeys .

Economic Indicators

Economy by Sector
2006

Health Indicators

References

External links 
www.portalsbu.com.br - A web site in Portuguese about the city

Municipalities in Pernambuco